AUL may refer to:

 Americans United for Life, an American anti-abortion organization
 Arctic Umiaq Line, a passenger and cargo coastal ferry in Greenland
 Arts, Sciences and Technology University in Lebanon
 Athletic Union League (Dublin), association football league in the Republic of Ireland
 Cork Athletic Union League, association football league in the Republic of Ireland
 Aur Airport, airstrip assigned the location identifier AUL by IATA
 Australia, UNDP country code